The third season of the reality television series Love & Hip Hop: Atlanta aired on VH1 from May 5, 2014 until September 8, 2014. The show was primarily filmed in Atlanta, Georgia. It was executively produced by Mona Scott-Young for Monami Entertainment, Toby Barraud and Stefan Springman for Eastern TV, and Susan Levison, Nina L. Diaz, Brad Abramson and Danielle Gelfand for VH1. 

The series chronicles the lives of several women and men in the Atlanta area, involved in hip hop music. It consists of 20 episodes, including a three-part reunion special hosted by Sommore.

Production

On April 14, 2014, VH1 announced that Love & Hip Hop: Atlanta would be returning for a third season on May 5, 2014. With the exception of Traci Steele, who was fired from the show, and K. Michelle, who left to join the cast of Love & Hip Hop: New York, all main cast members from the previous season returned. Waka Flocka Flame's long time girlfriend Tammy Rivera was added to the main cast. Lil Scrappy's girlfriend Adiz "Bambi" Benson, Mimi's boyfriend Nikko London, Joseline's former friend Dawn Heflin and Waka's mother Deb Antney joined the supporting cast, along with Waka Flocka Flame, Yung Joc, aspiring actress Erica Pinkett, Kalenna Harper, her husband Tony "T." Vick and Benzino's girlfriend Althea Heart.

Synopsis
Mimi has a tough decision to make when her sex tape with Nikko leaks and she is approached by one of the biggest porn companies in the world. Stevie and Joseline have announced that they are now married, but no one in Atlanta believes them, turning old friends into new enemies. Karlie has found love with rapper Yung Joc but becomes suspicious when he spends so much time with his "assistant". Scrappy is once again caught between two women, Bambi and Erica Pinkett. Rasheeda and Kirk welcome their newborn son, Karter into the family, only to find out that Kirk is up to his old tricks.

Reception
The season was a huge ratings success, with the series premiere having a combined rating of 5.6 million viewers and continuing to set ratings records throughout the season. The outrageous storylines and scandals, particularly Mimi and Nikko's sex tape, Benzino's non-fatal shooting and Joseline's violent behavior at the reunion, garnered a media storm and made its cast members tabloid fixtures. In reference to Benzino's shooting in particular, creator and executive producer Mona Scott-Young said "The timing and the way that it happened, you have another moment that you go, you can’t make this stuff up. It’s like the reality gods have once again chosen this show to smile upon.”

Cast

Starring

 Joseline Hernandez (19 episodes)
 Erica Dixon (16 episodes)
 Rasheeda (19 episodes)
 Tammy Rivera (13 episodes)
 Karlie Redd (17 episodes)
 Mimi Faust (19 episodes)

Also starring

 Stevie J (20 episodes)
 Kirk Frost (17 episodes)
 Waka Flocka Flame (9 episodes)
 Lil Scrappy (17 episodes)
 Bambi Benson (11 episodes)
 Ariane Davis (11 episodes)
 Nikko London (17 episodes)
 Momma Dee (16 episodes)
 Benzino (20 episodes)
 Yung Joc (12 episodes)
 Erica Pinkett (7 episodes)
 Kalenna Harper (16 episodes)
 Dawn Heflin (9 episodes)
 Deb Antney (11 episodes)
 Althea Heart (12 episodes)
 Tony Vick (12 episodes)

K. Michelle returns in a guest appearance in one episode. Shirleen Harvell, Kirk's potential babysitter Jasmine Swann, Yung Joc's assistant Khadiyah Lewis and Kalenna's girlfriend Ashley T. Moore appear as guest stars in several episodes. The show features minor appearances from notable figures within the hip hop industry and Atlanta's social scene, including Steven Hirsch, Erica's boyfriend O'Shea Russell, Jeremih, Bobby V, DJ Vlad, Stevie J and Mimi's daughter Eva Jordan, Erica's mother Mingnon Dixon, Nikko's friend Johnny Crome, Snoop Dogg and Joseline's producer Fly Dantoni.

Episodes

Music
Several cast members had their music featured on the show and released singles to coincide with the airing of the episodes.

References

External links

2014 American television seasons
Love & Hip Hop